CHARAS/El Bohio Community Center was a neighborhood organization and squatted community center in New York's East Village between 1979 and 2001.

Background 

Public School 64, the 130,000-square-foot building in Manhattan's East Village that would become the CHARAS/El Bohio Community Center, was active between its completion in 1906 and its closure in 1977. It was designed in the French Renaissance Revival style by C.B.J. Snyder during a time when a population boom required schools. During New York's 1970s fiscal crisis, the surrounding neighborhood fell into disrepair. The building itself had become a drug house. Local residents, many Latino immigrants, reclaimed these buildings.

CHARAS was an organization that emerged from the Real Great Society, a self-organized, education-focused group of young organizers who had grown up in the neighborhood of Loisaida. Unlike the Real Great Society, CHARAS was a holistic, multi-issue organization that addressed issues as wide-ranging as housing, environmentalism, education, job training, and the arts. CHARAS was initially founded as the CHARAS committee in 1965, taking its name from the first initials of the founders: Chino Garcia, Humberto Crespo, Angelo González, Roy Battiste, (Moses) Anthony Figueroa, and Sal Becker. The committee formalized as an organization in the early 1970s. The organization consulted with mathematician Buckminster Fuller over many years on alternative technology, sweat equity, and geodesic domes to house the poor.

CHARAS originally squatted the nearby Christodora House with former Black Panthers in 1979 but came to an agreement with the city to vacate the settlement house in exchange for the derelict, former P.S. 64. In a gentlemen's agreement, a private developer purchased the Christadora (to become luxury condominiums) and CHARAS began to build P.S. 64 into El Bohio.

Activity 

CHARAS moved into P.S. 64 in 1979. The squatters renovated into a cultural center known as El Bohio ("the hut"). The community center's arts and cultural programming included classes, meeting spaces, studio spaces, after-school activities, tutoring, a bicycle recycling program, with showing including dance, film, and theater. Director Spike Lee showed his work at El Bohio while studying at New York University. In its time, CHARAS/El Bohio was among the most prominent of a series of institutions secured through community effort and served as the political center of multiple community centers and gardens founded in the same period.

The building was frequently filled with art, including huge sculptures and floats. Its auditorium, rooms, or full building were available for rental at affordable prices. Community gardening groups often met there, and the banners and puppets behind the community's famous spring and winter festivals were built there. Anthropologist David Graeber described it as an "inestimable resource" for activists.

Eviction 

Within three years of the squat, a local community board had recommended that CHARAS receive the building's lease. This request was upheld by the City Council, Department of City Planning, and the City Planning Commission. They received the lease and made offers to buy the building that the city deemed unworkable. Community activists fought to keep the building in community possession. The activists, upon seeing that CHARAS and other community gardens were listed for auction in July 1998, coordinated the release of 10,000 crickets to disrupt it, an event that is mythical among Lower West Side activists. After a brief intermission, the building sold for $3.15 million to Gregg Singer, who was originally anonymous but later revealed as a campaign contributor of Mayor Rudolph Giuliani. Singer immediately served an eviction order, which wasn't enforced until December 2001. During that period, the Village Voice rated the site as the city's "Best Place to Rally Around and/or Resuscitate" based on its community services for the Lower East Side. The eviction was delayed by the September 11 attacks and by "Singer alerts", in which the landlord was required to announce prospective tenant visits in advance, giving activists ample time to organize an impromptu demonstration. An initial trial ruled unanimously in favor of CHARAS but was invalidated by a second judge. Squatters planned to occupy and defend the building, particularly to protect precedent, but CHARAS demurred because they wanted the city's future support as a community organization. New York Reclaim the Streets held a block party for a final defense and celebration of the space, which had become a symbolic for community losses due to gentrification.

As of 2022, the building was left undeveloped and the property foreclosed, while multiple protests have been held in support of returning the building to community oriented use. At the time of eviction, Singer planned to turn the building into a college dormitory but the Department of Buildings has denied the project. The building was designated as a landmark in 2006, limiting Singer's high-rise plans. Additionally, a local law requires proof of a 10-year lease from a college before approving dorm development. Singer has filed multiple lawsuits against the city. In 2017, Mayor Bill de Blasio expressed interest in the city repurchasing the building. As of 2008, the CHARAS organization remained without a home.

References

Bibliography

Further reading

External links 

 Charas papers at Hunter College's Archives of the Puerto Rican Diaspora
 Oral history with Chino Garcia

Community centers in the United States
East Village, Manhattan
Hispanic and Latino American culture in New York City
Hispanic and Latino American organizations
Legalized squats
Squats in the United States
Buildings and structures in Manhattan
1979 establishments in New York City
Housing in New York City